Let 'Em Bleed: The Mixxtape, Vol. 3 is a mixtape by DJ Clay. Released in 2008, it is the third installment of a three-per-year series of mixtapes which contain brand new and remixed songs from artists from the Psychopathic Records and Hatchet House roster. The song "Can't Hold Me Back '08" was created in honor of the 20th anniversary of the original Awesome Dre version, and features some of the biggest Detroit rappers of then and now.

Track listing

Chart positions

References

2008 mixtape albums
Hatchet House compilation albums
Sequel albums